The Csardas King (German: Der Czardas-König) is a 1958 West German musical film directed by Harald Philipp and starring Gerhard Riedmann, Rudolf Schock and Elma Karlowa. It is a biopic of the life of the Hungarian operetta composer Emmerich Kalman.

The film's sets were designed by the art directors Helmut Nentwig and Heinrich Weidemann. It was shot at the Spandau Studios in Berlin and on location in Budapest. It was made in Eastmancolor.

Cast
 Gerhard Riedmann as Emmerich Kalman / Imre Kalman 
 Rudolf Schock as Janos 
 Elma Karlowa as Ilonka 
 Sabine Bethmann as Helene 
 Marina Orschel as Vera 
 Hubert von Meyerinck as Szegedy 
 Richard Häussler as Graf Riedern 
 Camilla Spira as Frau Kalman 
 Richard Allan as Stefan 
 Monika Dahlberg as Rozsi 
 Alice Treff as Countess Tabory 
 Béla Pásztor as Bela, Zigeunerprimas 
 Maly Delschaft as Hauswirtin 
 Gerd Frickhöffer
 Kurt Waitzmann as Kriektor Karscak

References

Bibliography
 Bock, Hans-Michael & Bergfelder, Tim. The Concise CineGraph. Encyclopedia of German Cinema. Berghahn Books, 2009.

External links 
 

1958 films
1950s biographical films
1950s historical musical films
German biographical films
German historical musical films
West German films
1950s German-language films
Films directed by Harald Philipp
Films about classical music and musicians
Films about composers
Films set in the 1910s
Films set in Vienna
Films set in Budapest
Films shot in Budapest
Films shot at Spandau Studios
Constantin Film films
1950s German films